Parkview Historic District may refer to:

Parkview Historic District (New Orleans, Louisiana), listed on the NRHP in Louisiana
Delmar Loop–Parkview Gardens Historic District, University City, Missouri, listed on the NRHP in Missouri
Parkview Historic District (St. Louis, Missouri), listed on the NRHP in Missouri
Parkview Historic District (University City, Missouri), listed on the NRHP in Missouri
Parkview Historic District (Milton, Wisconsin), listed on the NRHP in Wisconsin